Randolph M. Nesse (born 1948) is an American physician, scientist and author who is notable for his role as a founder of the field of evolutionary medicine and evolutionary psychiatry. He is professor of life sciences and ASU Foundation Professor at Arizona State University, where he became the Founding Director of the Center for Evolution and Medicine in 2014.  He was previously a professor of psychiatry, professor of psychology and research professor at the University of Michigan where he led the Evolution and Human Adaptation Program and helped to establish one of the world's first anxiety disorders clinics and conducted research on neuroendocrine responses to fear.

His research on the evolution of aging led to a long collaboration with the evolutionary biologist George C. Williams. Their co-authored book, Why We Get Sick: The New Science of Darwinian Medicine, inspired fast growth of the field of evolutionary medicine. His subsequent research has focused on how natural selection shapes mechanisms that regulate pain, fever, anxiety, low mood, and why emotional disorders are so common. He also has written extensively about the evolutionary origins of moral emotions, and strategies for establishing evolutionary biology as a basic science for medicine.  Good Reasons for Bad Feelings: Insights from the Frontier of Evolutionary Psychiatry applies the principles of evolutionary medicine to mental disorders.

He was the initial organizer and second president of the Human Behavior and Evolution Society, and is currently the president of the International Society for Evolution, Medicine & Public Health. He is a Distinguished Life Fellow of the American Psychiatric Association, a Fellow of the Association for Psychological Sciences, and an elected Fellow of the AAAS.

References

Experts List - University of Michigan
"Depression Debunking", by MICHAEL M. GINDI, New York Times, February 8, 2000
"Viewing Depression As Tool for Survival", By ERICA GOODE, New York Times, February 1, 2000
http://sites.google.com/site/evolutionarymedicine/home/texts/text4
https://sols.asu.edu/people/randolph-m-nesse
http://evmed.asu.edu/

 

Nesse, Randolph M (Ed.). (2001). Evolution and the capacity for commitment. New York: Russell Sage Foundation.

Nesse, Randolph M, & Dawkins, R. (2010). Evolution: Medicine's most basic science. In D. A. Warrell, T. M. Cox, J. D. Firth, & E. J. J. Benz (Eds.), Oxford Textbook of Medicine, 5th edition (pp. 12–15). Oxford: Oxford University Press.

Published materials
Nesse, R. M. (1999). "Testing evolutionary hypotheses about mental disorders." In S. Stearns (Ed.), Evolution in Health and Disease (pp. 260–266). New York: Oxford University Press.
Nesse, R. M., & Williams, G. C. (1995). Why We Get Sick. New York: Times Books.

Nesse, R. M., & Williams, G. C. (1999). "Research designs that address evolutionary questions about medical disorders." In S. Stearns (Ed.), Evolution in Health and Disease (pp. 16–26). New York: Oxford University Press.
"Is the market on Prozac?", February 28, 2000 Stanford University Press

External links

Personal Website

1948 births
Living people
Evolutionary biologists
Evolutionary psychologists
21st-century American biologists
21st-century American psychologists
American psychiatrists
University of Michigan faculty
University of Michigan Medical School alumni
20th-century American psychologists